The Discovery Center of Taipei is an educational center in Xinyi District, Taipei, Taiwan. The center is located at Taipei City Hall.

History
The center was inaugurated on 16 December 2002 presided by Taipei Mayor Ma Ying-jeou from the former Taipei City Archives. He said that the center was established to let Taipei residents to understand the history of Taipei City better.

Architecture
The center is located in the renovated former Taipei City information center of the city hall. The center consists of:

 Taipei Impression Hall
 Special Exhibition Hall
 City Discovery Hall
 "Dialogue with Time" Hall

Transportation
The museum is accessible within walking distance South from Taipei City Hall Station of the Taipei Metro.

See also
 List of tourist attractions in Taiwan

References

External links

 

2002 establishments in Taiwan
Buildings and structures completed in 2002
Buildings and structures in Taipei
Science centers in Taiwan
Tourist attractions in Taipei